The 2004 St. Petersburg Open was a tennis tournament played on indoor hard courts at the Petersburg Sports and Concert Complex in Saint Petersburg in Russia and was part of the International Series of the 2004 ATP Tour. It was the 10th edition of the tournament wand was held from October 25 through October 31, 2004.

Finals

Singles

 Mikhail Youzhny  defeated  Karol Beck 6–2, 6–2

Doubles

 Arnaud Clément /  Michaël Llodra defeated  Dominik Hrbatý /  Jaroslav Levinský 6–3, 6–2

External links
 Official website  
 Official website 
 ATP Tournament Profile

St. Petersburg Open
St. Petersburg Open
St. Petersburg Open
St. Petersburg Open